Iron Trail Motors Event Center is an ice arena and Event Center located in the city of Virginia, Minnesota. It was completed in September 2021. The two-story building has a 120,000 square-foot total area and includes two ice rinks, fitness facilities and a 6,400-square-foot ballroom for weddings. It can also be used as a venue center for concerts. The arena offers skating lessons, open skating and open hockey. The arena is the home rink for the Rock Ridge Wolverines Hockey. The Rock Ridge Hockey Association coordinates the youth hockey program.

History 
The Miners Memorial Building was originally built in 1958 and that arena was used for Virginia Blue Devils hockey until the 2020-2021 season and was demolished in 2021 after the last high school game in the Miners Virginia vs. their biggest rivals of the time Eveleth. The two teams were rivals until the 2021 season when the two teams as the Rock Ridge Wolverines due to the new Rock Ridge High school and elementary schools being opened in 2022 (Elem.) and 2023 (HS). The new Iron Trail Motors Event Center was originally going to be named Miners Event Convention Center (MECC) but Iron Trail Motors, a car dealership in Virginia off U.S. 53 bought stakes in the arena in summer 2021 and changed the name for 20 years at a cost of 1.1 million dollars.

References

External links

Sports venues in Minnesota
Indoor ice hockey venues in Minnesota
Sports venues completed in 2021
Sports venues in the Duluth–Superior metropolitan area
2021 establishments in Minnesota